Rudolf Riedl (born 7 June 1907, date of death unknown) was an Austrian speed skater. He competed in four events at the 1928 Winter Olympics.

References

1907 births
Year of death missing
Austrian male speed skaters
Olympic speed skaters of Austria
Speed skaters at the 1928 Winter Olympics
Place of birth missing
20th-century Austrian people